Otuho, also known as Lotuko (Lotuxo), is the language of the Otuho people. It is an Eastern Nilotic language, and has several other Otuho speaking dialectic groups.

Language varieties
Dongotono is related.

Other related varieties may be:
Logir 
Ifoto 
Imatong

References

Eastern Nilotic languages
Languages of South Sudan